The Battle of Drohiczyn (Polish: Bitwa pod Drohiczynem) took place in 1194 between the allied Yotvingian and Kievan Rus' forces that raised Polish Rebels against the opposing Kingdom of Poland army led by Duke Casimir II the Just. The Polish army won the battle. The battle took place near the village Drohiczyn. Later Cumanians arrived.

Drohiczyn
Drohiczyn
Drohiczyn
1194 in Europe
12th century in Poland
12th century in Kievan Rus'